The Leonard M. Fowle Trophy is a sailing trophy awarded annually by the Intercollegiate Sailing Association to the best overall collegiate team.

The team with the most points, which are compiled results of the ICSA Women’s Singlehanded, Men’s Singlehanded, Match Racing, Women’s Dinghy, Team Racing, and Coed Dinghy National Championships, determines the Fowle trophy.

Winners

References 

Inter-Collegiate Sailing Association
Sailing awards